United States v. Constantine, 296 U.S. 287 (1935), was a case before the United States Supreme Court that concerned liquor laws and taxation. Congress placed a tax on liquor dealers who violate state liquor laws. The Court struck down the relevant portion of the Revenue Act of 1926 as an attempt to punish a state violation through taxation.

Background 
A Prohibition era federal law required that sellers of alcohol obtain a federal excise license which costs $25 if the holder was in compliance with state law but $1,000 if they were not. The appellee had paid the lower fee but was found to be in violation of Alabama law by selling malt liquor in a Birmingham restaurant that exceeded the strength allowed by state law. The federal government then pursued Constantine for the $975 difference even though the violation occurred after the repeal of Prohibition.

Opinion of the court 
The court ruled that the primary purpose of the tax law was to enforce police powers not to raise revenue. Since the repeal of the Eighteenth Amendment, the federal law was no longer enforceable.

Dissents 
Justice Cardozo, in an opinion joined by Justices Brandeis and Stone, dissented, arguing that Congress could have had any one of several non-punitive justifications for the statute.

Subsequent history 
National Federation of Independent Business v. Sebelius referenced the logic in this decision to determine whether the Affordable Care Act was a penalty or tax in terms of the Constitution. The Court held that it was a tax by "[d]isregarding the designation of the exaction, and viewing its substance and application."

See also
List of United States Supreme Court cases, volume 296

External links

 

United States Supreme Court cases
1935 in United States case law
United States taxation and revenue case law
United States Supreme Court cases of the Hughes Court
United States Eighteenth Amendment case law
United States Twenty-first Amendment case law
History of Birmingham, Alabama
Legal history of Alabama
Restaurants in Birmingham, Alabama